The Bezirk Hallein is an administrative district (Bezirk) in the federal state of Salzburg, Austria, and congruent with the Tennengau region.

Area of the district is 668.31 km², with a population of 54,282 (May 15, 2001), and population density 81 persons per km². Administrative center of the district is Hallein.

Administrative divisions 
The district is divided into 13 municipalities, one of them is a town, and four of them are market towns.

Towns 
 Hallein (18,399)

Market towns 
 Abtenau (3,324)
 Golling an der Salzach (3,903)
 Kuchl (6,431)
 Oberalm (3,844)

Municipalities 
 Adnet (3,324)
 Annaberg-Lungötz (2,296)
 Bad Vigaun (1,885)
 Krispl (849)
 Puch bei Hallein (4,088)
 Rußbach am Paß Gschütt (803)
 Sankt Koloman (1,497)
 Scheffau am Tennengebirge (1,292)

(population numbers May 15, 2001)

External links

 
Districts of Salzburg (state)